Fire Station No. 17 may refer to:

Portland Fire Station No. 17, Portland, Oregon, NRHP-listed
Engine Company 17, Washington, D.C., NRHP-listed

See also
List of fire stations